The abbreviation GWFC may refer to one of the following:

 Glasshoughton Welfare F.C.
 Great Wyrley F.C.
 Great West Football Conference US college football conference now called the Great West Conference